Fenton railway station was opened in 1864 by the North Staffordshire Railway on its line to Derby. It closed in 1961. It was located in Heron Cross and was one of two stations in the area, the other being Fenton Manor.

The buildings and platforms have been demolished although the site itself is still identifiable, occupied by a communications mast.

References

Further reading

Disused railway stations in Stoke-on-Trent
Railway stations in Great Britain closed in 1961
Railway stations in Great Britain opened in 1864
Former North Staffordshire Railway stations